Narahari Umanath Prabhu (25 April 1924 – 14 October 2022) was an Indian-American mathematician, known for his contributions to operation research, in particular queueing theory. He did not seek a Ph.D., however he guided a number of Ph.Ds.

Career
Prabhu, who was from Mangalore and Kozhikode got a B.A. in mathematics from University of Madras (1946), a M.A. in statistics from University of Bombay (1950). Prabhu was the founding head of the department of statistics, Karnatak University, Dharwar in 1951. He obtained a M.Sc. in mathematics from University of Manchester on a thesis entitled Solution to Some Dam Problems (1957).

Prabhu lectured at Gauhati University (1950–1952), Karnatak University (1952–1961), University of Western Australia (1961–1964), before becoming associate professor at University of Michigan (1964–1965) and Cornell University (1965–1994) where he became professor (1967) and emeritus (1994). Prabhu also had longer research stays at Indian Statistical Institute in Calcutta (1961), University of Wisconsin–Madison (1970, 1973), Technion in Haifa (1973), University of Melbourne (1978), University of Maryland, College Park (1979), and Uppsala University (1984) .

Prabhu was the founding editor of the Queueing Systems (journal) (1986–1994) and has edited several other journals, as well as published books on Foundations of Queueing Theory (Springer Verlag, 1997) and Stochastic storage processes (Springer, 1998).

The South Asia Program at Cornell created the Rabindranath Tagore Endowment in Modern Indian Literature, made possible through a gift by Professor Emeritus Narahari Umanath Prabhu and his wife .

Prabhu died on 14 October 2022, at the age of 98.

Awards
INFORMS (Applied Probability) Award of Honor (1997)
 Honorary fellow of the Indian statistical association (1998)

References

 
  On Google scholar

1924 births
2022 deaths
Queueing theorists
Cornell University faculty
Alumni of the University of Manchester
Indian emigrants to the United States
American people of Malayali descent
University of Mumbai alumni
Scientists from Kozhikode
Academic journal editors
Academic staff of Gauhati University
University of Madras alumni
Academic staff of Karnatak University
Academic staff of the University of Western Australia
University of Michigan faculty
American editors
Indian editors
Scientists from Kerala
20th-century Indian mathematicians
Indian expatriates in the United Kingdom
Indian expatriates in Australia